Tsunku is a Japanese singer, songwriter, and record producer. In the 1990s, Tsunku rose to fame as the lead singer of the band Sharam Q, where he wrote songs for the band.

During the broadcast of Asayan in search for a new member of Sharam Q, Tsunku gave the opportunity for the runner-ups to debut as Morning Musume in 1997. Since the foundation of the group, Tsunku has been their primary producer. In addition, he later founded Hello! Project in 1998 as a musical collective for Morning Musume and become the primary producer of their acts, including Aya Matsuura, Maki Goto, Coconuts Musume, V-u-den, Berryz Kobo, and Cute. Outside of Hello! Project, Tsunku became the primary producer for EE Jump, Sonim, and Nice Girl Project!

Outside of artists, Tsunku also produced soundtracks for the Rhythm Heaven video game series and was a contributing artist for ClassicaLoid. In 2015, Tsunku has become the fifth best-selling songwriter in Japan.

Released songs

1998

1999

2000

2001

2002

2003

2004

Unreleased songs

Soundtracks

2016

2018

Notes

References

Songs written by Tsunku
Song recordings produced by Tsunku
Hello! Project